Christian Nicholas Stadil is a Danish executive and chairman. He owns the sports brand Hummel International, is CEO of Thornico Group and co-author of Company Karma. In 2014 he was appointed honorary professor of creative leadership at the Centre for Business Development and Management at Copenhagen Business School.

In 2015, Stadil began appearing as one of five "lions" on the investment TV show Løvens Hule ("Lions' Den"), the Danish version of the reality TV franchise Dragons' Den.

References

External links 
 Christian Stadil's personal webpage
 Thornico A/S

20th-century Danish businesspeople
21st-century Danish businesspeople
Living people
Danish male writers
Danish Buddhists]
1971 births